Igziabeher means literally "Lord of a nation or tribe", i.e. God, in the Ethiopian or Ge'ez language, as well as modern Ethiosematic languages including Amharic.

Today, when directly translated into English, means ethnic group.

Igziabher is also used within the Rastafari movement as a name of Jah (God). It may be heard in the reggae music of artists such as Peter Tosh (who recorded a song named "Igziabeher (Let Jah Be Praised)" on his album Legalize It), The Abyssinians, Third World and Midnite.

In the fourth century, King Ezana ruled a large part of modern-day North Ethiopia.  e worshipped several Gods called Beher, Meder, and Astar.  Igziabeher is possibly a variant of the name Beher.

References 

Amharic language
Ge'ez language
Rastafari